FC Spicul Chișcăreni was a Moldovan football club based in Chișcăreni, Moldova. They played in the Divizia Națională, the top division in Moldovan football. The club was founded in 2014.

Achievements
Divizia B
 Winners (1): 2014–15
Divizia A
 Winners (1): 2015–16

List of seasons

References

External links
Profile at Soccerway

Football clubs in Moldova
Association football clubs established in 2014
2014 establishments in Moldova
Association football clubs disestablished in 2017
2017 disestablishments in Moldova
Defunct football clubs in Moldova